The 1922 New York Yankees season was the 20th season for the Yankees. The team finished with a record of 94 wins and 60 losses, to win their second pennant in franchise history, by a single game over the St. Louis Browns. New York was managed by Miller Huggins. Their home games were played at the Polo Grounds.

In the 1922 World Series, the Yankees again lost to their landlords, the New York Giants, 4 games to none with one tied game. The final game of the Series was also the Yankees' final game as a tenant in the Polo Grounds. During the season, they had begun construction of their new home, Yankee Stadium, which would open in 1923.

Regular season

The Yankees started the season without their star, Babe Ruth, who was serving a suspension due to breaking the rule (along with several other Yankees) against World Series participants barnstorming. Although Commissioner Landis refused to back down on his enforcement of the rule, he did repeal the seemingly absurd rule by the end of the 1922 season.

Season standings

Record vs. opponents

Roster

Player stats

Batting

Starters by position
Note: Pos = Position; G = Games played; AB = At bats; H = Hits; Avg. = Batting average; HR = Home runs; RBI = Runs batted in

Other batters
Note: G = Games played; AB = At bats; H = Hits; Avg. = Batting average; HR = Home runs; RBI = Runs batted in

Pitching

Starting pitchers
Note: G = Games pitched; IP = Innings pitched; W = Wins; L = Losses; ERA = Earned run average; SO = Strikeouts

Other pitchers
Note: G = Games pitched; IP = Innings pitched; W = Wins; L = Losses; ERA = Earned run average; SO = Strikeouts

Relief pitchers
Note: G = Games pitched; W = Wins; L = Losses; SV = Saves; ERA = Earned run average; SO = Strikeouts

World series

Farm system

Notes

References
1922 New York Yankees at Baseball Reference
1922 World Series
1922 New York Yankees team page at www.baseball-almanac.com

New York Yankees seasons
New York Yankees
New York Yankees
1920s in Manhattan
American League champion seasons
Washington Heights, Manhattan